CCCF may refer to:

 Confederación Centroamericana y del Caribe de Fútbol, the governing body of association football in Central America and the Caribbean until 1961
 CCCF Championship, an association football tournament for teams in the area of Central America and the Caribbean, 1941–1961
 CCCF Youth Championship, a soccer tournament 1954–1960
 Canadian Child Care Federation, largest Canadian national service based early learning and child care organization
 Chaos Computer Club France, a fake hacker organization created in 1989 in Lyon, France
 Coffee Creek Correctional Facility, a women's prison and prisoner intake center in Wilsonville, Oregon
 Cold Creek Correctional Facility, a Tennessee Department of Correction prison
 Communauté de communes du Canton de Fauquembergues

See also
 CCF (disambiguation)
 CCCCF
 CFFF
 FCCC
 FFFC